James Hazell (born 29 July 1986), better known by his stage name FuntCase, is an English dubstep and drum and bass producer and DJ, from Bournemouth, England.  Hazell first released drum and bass, under the alias DJ Dose in 2007, and in 2009 released his first single under the name FuntCase.

In 2010 he was signed to Flux Pavilion and Doctor P's record label Circus Records, while also releasing music under the alias Haze. He is well known for performing wearing his signature mask.

In early 2013 he announced his largest release, the eight-track Don't Piss Me Off EP.  It was also announced that he and Cookie Monsta would present the second Circus Records Showcase album "Circus Two".

Discography

Releases (as FuntCase)

Production credits

References

Living people
English record producers
English DJs
Dubstep musicians
Masked musicians
Musicians from Bournemouth
Remixers
1986 births
Electronic dance music DJs